Linda Kay Pennell Johnson (May 2, 1945 – February 18, 2020) was a  Republican member of the North Carolina House of Representatives, representing the state's 82nd district. She was a computer analyst from Kannapolis, North Carolina.

Johnson graduated from A.L. Brown High School, in Kannapolis, North Carolina, in 1963. She served on the Kannaspolis City Board of Education from 1992 to 2000. She was first elected in 2000, defeating Len Sossamon, who was appointed to finish Richard Lee Moore's term. While battling cancer, she suffered multiple strokes and died in February 2020, while still in office.

Electoral history

2018

2016

2014

2012

2010

2008

2006

2004

2002

2000

References

External links
 North Carolina General Assembly page

1945 births
2020 deaths
School board members in North Carolina
Republican Party members of the North Carolina House of Representatives
Women state legislators in North Carolina
People from Kannapolis, North Carolina
21st-century American politicians
21st-century American women politicians